The Ubora Towers is a complex of two towers in the Business Bay district of Dubai, United Arab Emirates. The development consists of the Ubora Commercial Tower and the Ubora Residential Tower. Construction of the Ubora Towers was completed in 2011. It was sold by to Senyar Real Estate in Mid 2018

The Ubora Commercial Tower, also known as the Ubora Tower 1, is a 58-story building. It has a total architectural height of 263 metres (862 ft). The Ubora Residential Tower, or Ubora Tower 2, is a 20-floor structure. The commercial skyscraper was topped out in 2011. The complex was designed by the architectural firm Aedas, with lighting design by AWA Lighting Designers, and is currently managed by Jones Lang Lasalle.

There is a public transport bus stop on both sides of the road named as U bora Tower which is where people working in nearby towers use to board and get down. All the buses crossing this tower expect bus number 26 & 50 lead to the nearest Metro Station which is Business Bay Metro Station.

See also 
 List of tallest buildings in Dubai

References
Notes

External links
Ubora Tower on Aedas
Ubora Tower on Jones Lang Lasalle
Ubora Tower on CTBUH
Ubora Tower on Emporis
Ubora Tower on SkyscraperPage
Ubora Tower on ProTenders
Ubora Tower on ProMaintaince

Residential buildings completed in 2011
Commercial buildings completed in 2011
Residential skyscrapers in Dubai
Andrew Bromberg buildings
High-tech architecture
Postmodern architecture